Darkman III: Die Darkman Die is a 1996 American superhero film and the second sequel to Sam Raimi's Darkman. It was released direct-to-video in 1996. Like the second film, it was directed by Bradford May, a television director and cinematographer who also served as the director of photography. Series creator Sam Raimi serves as an executive producer.

Plot
Peyton Westlake is still searching for the key to creating a permanent liquid-skin formula to repair his burned face and hands. After Westlake, as his alter-ego Darkman, stops a criminal exchange spearheaded by corrupt businessman and crime boss Peter Rooker, he is approached by Dr. Bridget Thorne. Thorne, one of the physicians who saved Westlake's life following his brutal attack at the hands of Robert G. Durant, convinces him that she wants to help perfect his liquid skin, and also repair his nervous system, allowing him to finally regain some of his sensory loss. Using a laboratory Thorne has set up in an abandoned industrial complex, Westlake manages to create a small amount of permanent liquid skin, which does not break down in sunlight as his other samples have.

Thorne then reveals she is actually Rooker's mistress. Rooker arrives and explains that he desires the super-human strength that Westlake has at his disposal. The two plan to use Westlake as a guinea pig to unlock the secrets behind his strength. Westlake is captured and his liquid skin sample and research are taken. Westlake has an electrical shock device implanted in his body and is put through a series of tests. Eventually, he manages to remove the device and escape Rooker's grasp.

Westlake, trying to learn more about Rooker, encounters his neglected wife Angela (Roxann Dawson) and her young daughter, Jenny. At first concerned, he eventually develops feelings for the two upon realizing how lonely and empty his life is. He uses his liquid skin to assume Rooker's identity and pours his energy into being a loving father and husband, including seeing Jenny perform in her school's production of Beauty and the Beast.

Rooker uses the data from Westlake's tests to create a super-strength formula. He gives it to his men, and orders them to assassinate an idealistic district attorney at a public gathering. Westlake arrives and is able to stop the assassination attempt. Rooker, discovering how Westlake has stolen his identity, murders Thorne and takes his own family back to Thorne's laboratory, holding them hostage. He then injects himself with the super-strength formula, and fights Westlake when he comes to rescue Angela and Jenny. Westlake reclaims the sample of permanent liquid skin during the fight, but his research disk is destroyed by Rooker. Darkman finally gets the upper hand and tricks Rooker into falling in an industrial shredder, killing him.

A damaged natural gas line then explodes, causing the lab to catch fire; Westlake is able to save Angela and Jenny, but Jenny's face is terribly burned. Westlake decides to use the liquid skin to repair Jenny's face rather than his own. After Angela thanks Westlake for saving her daughter, he leaves them, vowing to continue his work on the formula while fighting crime as Darkman.

Cast

Release

Home media
Die, Darkman, Die was released on DVD in 2004 as part of the "Universal Studio Selections". The DVD contained no bonus material or even a main menu (although there still were chapter selections).

All three Darkman films were released in a box set by Universal Studios Home Entertainment in August 2007.

Shout! Factory released a Special Edition Blu-ray of the film in November 2017, featuring a new audio commentary with director Bradford May.

Reception

Critical response
The film holds a rotten score of 33% on Rotten Tomatoes, indicating a mixed to negative response from critics.

Possible direct sequel
In April 2022, Neeson was in talks about reprising his role for a legacy sequel to the original film. The producer of the sequel film was attached, and the studio had started to talk about the sequel.

References

External links
 

American vigilante films
American superhero films
1996 films
1990s action films
1990s superhero films
1990s vigilante films
Renaissance Pictures productions
Direct-to-video sequel films
Universal Pictures direct-to-video films
Films with screenplays by Michael Colleary
Films directed by Bradford May
1990s English-language films
1990s American films